The 1898 FA Cup final was an association football match between Derby County and Nottingham Forest on Saturday, 16 April 1898 at the Crystal Palace stadium in south London. It was the final match of the 1897–98 FA Cup, the 27th edition of the world's oldest football knockout competition, and England's primary cup competition, the Football Association Challenge Cup, better known as the FA Cup.

Derby County and Nottingham Forest were both appearing in their first final. As members of the Football League First Division, they were exempt from the competition's qualifying phase and each joined the competition in the first round proper, progressing through four rounds to the final.

The final was watched by a crowd of 62,017 and Forest, leading 2–1 at half-time, won the match 3–1 with goals by Arthur Capes (2) and John McPherson. Steve Bloomer scored for Derby. Forest won the cup again in 1959. Derby reached the final again in 1899 but were defeated by Sheffield United; they won the cup in 1946.

Background
The FA Cup, known officially as The Football Association Challenge Cup, is an annual knockout association football competition in men's domestic English football. The competition was first proposed on 20 July 1871 by C. W. Alcock at a meeting of The Football Association committee. The tournament was first played in the 1871–72 season and is the world's oldest association football competition. The 1898 match between Derby County and Nottingham Forest at Crystal Palace was the 27th final. Both teams were appearing in the final for the first time.

Derby County and Nottingham Forest were both members of the Football League First Division. In the 1897–98 league championship, Forest amassed 31 points to finish in eighth place, eleven points behind champions Sheffield United. Derby finished in tenth place, three points behind Forest.

Both teams were selected by a committee with the club secretary in charge on match days. Derby's secretary was Harry Newbould who, in 1900, became their first formally appointed team manager. Nottingham Forest retained the policy of selection by committee until 1936. In 1898, their secretary was Harry Hallam.

Route to the final

Derby County

Derby County entered the competition in the first round proper and played five matches, including one replay, en route to the final. All four of their opponents were other teams in the First Division.

Early rounds
In the first round on Saturday, 29 January, Derby were at home to Aston Villa

Semi-final
The semi-finals were staged at neutral venues on Saturday, 19 March. Derby faced Liverpool's Merseyside neighbours Everton at Molineux, where Derby had won their second round tie in February.

Nottingham Forest

Nottingham Forest entered the competition in the first round proper and played five matches, including one replay, en route to the final. One of their opponents was in the First Division, two were in the Second Division and one was in the Southern League.

Early rounds
In the first round on Saturday, 29 January, Forest were at home to Second Division Grimsby Town.

Semi-final
The semi-finals were staged at neutral venues on Saturday, 19 March, and Forest were drawn to play Southern League champions Southampton at Bramall Lane in Sheffield.

Match

Forest took the lead with a goal by Capes which Bloomer equalised. After 42 minutes, Richards tried to lob from a McInnes cross. Fryer was reached it first but he dropped the ball at the feet of Capes, who turned it into the empty goal.

In the second half, McPherson scored Forest's third goal four minutes from time.

Details

Post-match
Presentation details and post-match events to follow

Notes

References

Bibliography
 

1898
1897–98 in English football
Derby County F.C. matches
Nottingham Forest F.C. matches
April 1898 sports events
1898 sports events in London